Blackburn Rovers F.C. finished in the top half of the Premier League for the third successive season, this time ending up in 7th place, ultimately not enough for European qualification. Manager Mark Hughes departed for Manchester City at the end of the season, while successful winger David Bentley was sold to Tottenham Hotspur for a club record fee. Striker Roque Santa Cruz, a summer signing from Bayern Munich, had the season of his life, scoring 19 league goals, making up for Benni McCarthy's loss of form. Despite interest for richer clubs, Santa Cruz stayed on for another season.

Final league table

First-team squad
Squad at end of season

Left club during season

Reserve squad

Statistics

Appearances and goals

|-
! colspan=16 style=background:#dcdcdc; text-align:center| Goalkeepers

|-
! colspan=16 style=background:#dcdcdc; text-align:center| Defenders

|-
! colspan=16 style=background:#dcdcdc; text-align:center| Midfielders

|-
! colspan=16 style=background:#dcdcdc; text-align:center| Forwards

|-
! colspan=16 style=background:#dcdcdc; text-align:center| Players transferred out during the season

Results

Pre-season

Premier League

Results by matchday

League Cup

FA Cup

UEFA Intertoto Cup

UEFA Cup

Notes

References

Blackburn Rovers F.C. seasons
Black